Photuris mysticalampas, also called the mysterious lantern firefly, is an endangered synchronous-flashing firefly species described in 2013.

Distribution
It is found in Delaware (in the Prime Hook National Wildlife Refuge) and also the border between Delaware and Maryland (within a  radius from the Nanticoke Wildlife Area and also within the area itself), two states within the United States, and it has not been spotted outside of the Delmarva Peninsula. It was once more widespread across Delaware, but it is now restricted to the south of the state. P. mysticalampas is found in inland wetland environments.

Conservation
The biggest threats causing it to become endangered are pollution, climate change and severe weather changes.  According to observations by Heckscher (2020), deep peat with sphagnum hummocks and dense vegetation appears to be an important habitat feature for the species, and larvae may be restricted to those areas.

Behaviour and description
Adults can be seen emerging from sphagnum hummocks at dusk.

References 

Photuris
Fauna of the Eastern United States
Insects of the United States
Natural history of Maryland
Beetles described in 2013